Sandholes is a small rural hamlet, located at a crossroads approximately  south of Cookstown in County Tyrone, Northern Ireland. The settlement is compact, with a modest range of services and community facilities. Existing dwellings are located within the core of the village and in small housing developments on the periphery. According to the 2011 census it has a population of 126 in 50 households.

Education
The village formerly held a primary school, which no longer exists.

Religion

The Sandholes Presbyterian Church serves Sandholes, the current church replaced the original in 1798 and was extended in 1862. A new modern church hall was built in 2016 to replace the one built in 1962. The village also holds Tullylagan Gospel Hall.

Places of interest
Tullylagan Vintage Owners Association have  at Berkeley's Farm, in the townland of Gallanagh (meaning white marsh), and here the association keeps the traditional methods of farming alive.

See also
List of places in County Tyrone
List of villages in Northern Ireland

References

External links

Villages in County Tyrone